C1RCA, also known as circa, is a skateboard footwear & apparel company that started in 1998 & is based in San Clemente, California. The brand was started by Chad Muska & Jamie Thomas. Their designs include the "Weed-Stash-Pocket", a zip pocket in the tongue of Chad Muska's shoe. In 2006, they released a video called "It's Time". The current USA pro team includes Adrian Lopez, James Brockman, and James Martin. It was started by Four Star Distribution with Chad Muska as its first professional rider. C1RCA is distributed in Europe by Option Distribution.

History/Team 
In 1999 Adrian Lopez, joined C1RCA team. Shortly after, Jamie Thomas joined. Lopez designed a signature shoe for the brand in 2001 and 2004.

References

External links

Shoe brands
Skateboarding companies
Companies based in Orange County, California
Clothing companies established in 1999
Shoe companies of the United States
2000s fashion
2010s fashion
Skateboard shoe companies
1999 establishments in California